Rushcutters Bay Studio was an Australian film studio built by Charles Cozens Spencer in 1912 at Rushcutters Bay, Sydney.

For a number of years it was the leading film studio in Sydney, being the base of operations for Australasian Films. In 1925 that company built a new studio.

In 1933 Cinesound Productions converted the studios into a backup for their main studios at Bondi.

Selected Films Shot at Studio
Know Thy Child (1921)
Prehistoric Hayseeds (1923)
The Digger Earl (1924)
Splendid Fellows (1934)

References

Australian film studios